The Stealth Key is a fully 3D metal printed security key invented by Alejandro Ojeda. It is a 3D metal printed key which hides the mechanical security features inside of the key - making it difficult to copy. Due to the unique design of the key, the locking mechanism is different than a conventional lock and key mechanism.

HistoryThe Stealth Key was conceptualized to prevent key duplication by 3D printing. With 3D printers and 3D scanners reaching the consumer market in early 2010, the key copy and patent protection of most security keys was made obsolete. Many individuals duplicated security keys and several companies offering key duplication services using smartphone images began commercial operation.

Manufacturing of keysUnlike most keys - which are produced by key blank stamping and subsequent hole drilling - the Stealth Key is manufactured by 3D printing a metal alloy into the key's shape.

References 

Locks (security device)
Security engineering
Security technology